"Where the Wild Roses Grow" is a murder ballad by Australian rock band Nick Cave and the Bad Seeds and pop singer Kylie Minogue. It is the fifth song and lead single from the band's ninth studio album, Murder Ballads (1996), released on Mute Records. It was written by the band's frontman Nick Cave and produced by Tony Cohen and Victor Van Vugt.

The song received a positive reception from music critics and became the band's most successful single worldwide reaching No. 3 in Norway, the top five in Australia, and the top twenty in the United Kingdom, Ireland, Germany and New Zealand. It also received a limited promotional release in the United States. The song was certified Gold in Germany in 1996 for 250,000 copies sold, despite never reaching the top ten in that country. It charted again at the bottom of the German Top 100 in 2008 because of digital downloads after it was used in a soap opera. "Where the Wild Roses Grow" was also certified Gold in Australia for selling 50,000 copies.

Cave was inspired to write "Where the Wild Roses Grow" after listening to the traditional song, "Down in the Willow Garden", a tale of a man courting a woman and killing her while they are out together. Cave arranged this tale as second of two B-sides, "The Ballad of Robert Moore & Betty Coltrane" / "The Willow Garden", released on the CD-Maxi single version.

Although the song does not feature on a Minogue studio album, it can be found on her compilations Hits+, Greatest Hits 1987–1999, Ultimate Kylie, The Abbey Road Sessions and Step Back in Time: The Definitive Collection. Minogue performed a chorus of the song during her Showgirl and Homecoming tours.

It reached number eight in Triple J's Hottest 100 1995. In 2012, NME listed the song in their 100 Best Songs of the 1990s list at number 35, while in 2014, NME placed it at number 378 on their list of the 500 Greatest Songs of All Time list.

Background
Cave described writing the song:

A CD of the track—which had Blixa Bargeld singing Minogue's lines—was sent to Minogue's parents' house (as she was staying there at the time) prior to her recording the song.

Nick Cave and the Bad Seeds and Kylie Minogue first performed the song publicly on 4 August 1995 in Cork, Republic of Ireland.

Composition
According to the sheet music edition published by SheetMusicNow.com, "Where The Wild Roses Grow" is written in the compound time signature of 6/8 and is set in the key signature of G minor, at a tempo of 56 beats per minute.

Critical reception
Larry Flick from Billboard wrote, "This is not a joke. Not since Debbie Gibson contributed backing vocals on the Circle Jerk's cover of the Soft Boys' "I Wanna Destroy You" has there been such an odd collaboration of musical talent. Australia's queen of bubble-gum pop meets the underground art rock of Nick Cave on this moody track. Forget "Loco-Motion": Minogue carries her own, as Cave catapults his vocals into a moody pit of musical melancholy and lyrical despair. Brilliant." Another editor, Paul Verna complimented it as a "ghostly beautiful duet". James Masterton for Dotmusic described the song as "a gorgeous, mellow 1940s-sounding ballad." Pan-European magazine Music & Media commented, "Written especially for Minogue, the diminutive singer forms an unlikely but stunning combination with Cave. A brooding and haunting song that finds Cave in a sombre, Leonard Cohen-type of mood against Minogue's declaring diction. The tension gradually builds up as each tells their own version of a tale of murder." A reviewer from Music Week rated it four out of five, adding, "Nick croons while Kylie purrs in this folksy foretaste of the album of murder ballads".

Music video

The music video for "Where the Wild Roses Grow", commissioned by Emma Davies for Mute Records, shot by director Rocky Schenck and produced by Nick Verden for Atlas Films, shows Kylie Minogue in character, apparently having been murdered by Nick Cave's character. We see her in ghost-like form and also in a river in a pose reminiscent of Millais' painting Ophelia (1851–52). The video ends with Cave's character putting a rose in Minogue's mouth and closing her eyelids.

Live performances
Cave and Minogue performed the song together live on stage in London on 3 June 2018 when Kylie made a surprise appearance during the Nick Cave and the Bad Seeds set at All Points East festival.

Minogue performed the song on the following concert tours:
Showgirl: The Greatest Hits Tour (performed as a medley with "Red Blooded Woman")
Showgirl: The Homecoming Tour (performed as a medley with "Red Blooded Woman")
For You, for Me (performed as a medley with "Red Blooded Woman")
Golden Tour (where Kylie presents a member of the audience with a single red rose)

Minogue appeared as a surprise guest at Coldplay's Enmore Theatre show in Sydney, Australia on 19 June 2014, where they performed the song as a duet. Cave and Minogue performed the song at the Glastonbury Festival 2019.

Other version
A guide track with the Bad Seeds guitarist, Blixa Bargeld, singing Kylie Minogue's vocal part was released on the compilation B-Sides & Rarities.

Awards
1996 ARIA Awards: 'Single of the Year', 'Song of the Year' & 'Best Pop Release'.

Formats and track listings
 Australian CD and cassette single; UK CD single (D1188; C 1188; CDMUTE 185)
"Where the Wild Roses Grow" (Cave) – 3:58
"The Ballad of Robert Moore & Betty Coltrane" (Cave) – 3:34
"The Willow Garden" (traditional) – 3:57

 UK 7-inch and cassette single (MUTE 185; CMUTE 185)
"Where the Wild Roses Grow" (Cave) – 3:58
"The Ballad of Robert Moore & Betty Coltrane" (Cave) – 3:34

Charts and certifications

Weekly charts

Year-end charts

Certifications

References

External links
Critical analysis of video - Rachael Zeleny

1995 singles
1995 songs
1990s ballads
ARIA Award-winning songs
Kylie Minogue songs
Male–female vocal duets
Murder ballads
Mute Records singles
Nick Cave songs
Songs written by Nick Cave